Herpetoculture is the keeping of live reptiles and amphibians in captivity, whether as a hobby or as a commercial breeding operation. "Herps" is an informal term for both reptiles and amphibians, shortened from the scientific umbrella term “herptiles”. It is undertaken by people of all ages and from all walks of life, including career herpetologists, professional reptile or amphibian breeders, and casual hobbyists.

Etymology
The origin of the word "herpetoculture" is credited to Tom Huff, who devised the word to distinguish what he, as a self-described "herpetoculturist", was doing—working to keeping reptiles and amphibians alive and healthy—from what herpetologists of that era were generally doing, namely, collecting specimens for preservation in museum collections. The word itself comes from the Greek language origin , which means "to creep".

Equipment

Enclosures 
Though traditional glass aquariums and terrariums are still widely used, in recent years glass and fiberglass cages designed specifically for herps have become more widely available. Many herpetoculturists prefer these newer enclosures as they come in larger sizes, are more secure, can be stacked, and are more easily modified to included heat and humidity sources. At one time it was commonly accepted to keep multiple creatures in a small enclosure; however, current cage size recommendations discourage this. These size recommendations differ depending on the species and its natural environment.

Vivaria
As reptiles are cold blooded they generally need to be kept in climate-controlled enclosures, especially when kept in regions further away from the equator. A standard enclosure usually incorporates a thermostat and a heat emitter; usually a heating pad, heat tape or an incandescent light bulb. Hot rocks can be used, but as a secondary heat source, as they often provide uneven heating. Some reptiles also require some form of Ultraviolet radiation which can be provided through a UV bulb. The lighting can be set to a timer to simulate a day/night cycle. Heat emitters are usually placed at one end of the enclosure to allow for a temperature gradient, so a reptile may move to the other end of the enclosure if it needs to cool itself.

Incubators
Many reptiles are oviparous and will lay eggs if successfully mated. Breeders may use incubators to increase their chances of successful hatching. Reptilian incubators generally consist of a thermostat and hygrometer, plus various heating and misting devices, as to create a stable environment. Unlike most avian eggs, reptile eggs do not need to be turned; in the wild they are generally laid in mounds or underground and left to incubate.

Husbandry

Feeding
Reptiles and amphibians can be omnivores, carnivores, or herbivores. Omnivorous reptiles can be fed species-dependent mixes of plant or meat-based foods, with additional supplementation, most commonly calcium. Carnivorous reptiles may need living or dried insects or whole rodents. Frozen rodents can be bought from pet shops and are then thawed before feeding, and live rodents can be kept and sustained before feeding. Some species of reptiles will also feed on smaller reptiles.

Breeding
Many species of reptiles have a seasonal breeding cycle. For example, in southern Australia, the Eastern Long Neck turtle brumates over winter before mating in spring. Herpetoculturists who wish to breed their reptiles may have to alter the environment in the vivarium to simulate seasons to encourage successful mating. Amphibians are easily bred in captivity. Due to their small size and low-maintenance requirements, large captive populations can be substantiated easily and for a low-cost compared to other organisms.

Controversy
While the most common, popular species of reptiles and amphibians are typically reared by hand from captive breeding (rather than wild-caught or field-collected), the blackmarket capture of numerous wild animals for the ihternational pet trade does still persist, especially in some countries of minimal economic opportunity; this practice can have an adverse and devastating impact on wild animal populations, as some local peoples are unaware of or simply do not care about the effect humans have on their environment. In Madagascar’s poorer, more isolated regions, local village children will be “hired” (recruited) by “animal dealers” to hand-capture as many live chameleons, geckos, frogs, snakes and other animals as possible, many of which are very rare and sensitive as well. The animals are often roughly handled by the children, even knocked from the treetops to the ground for collecting, before being hastily placed into a bag, box or sack; there are often many animals in one container, clambering on top of each other. Chameleons, especially, have a natural solitary way of being, and have very sensitive systems on top of that. Many do not survive transit. Upon delivery to the dealers, these children are given the equivalent of US$00.01-$00.10, approximately. The animals are then shipped to the rest of the world, still packed like sardines. Once arrived at their destination, at times, 50-75% of the animals caught and shipped will be dead on arrival—from stress, fighting, rapid temperature fluctuations during transit, disease exposure, chemical exposures, and more.  Additionally, exotic species may escape from or be released by irresponsible pet owners and become invasive species. For these reasons, captive breeding is always the recommended choice for obtaining any pet reptile or amphibian, not only for conservation reasons, but for the added benefit of a hand-reared animal being “innately” accustomed to humans and their presence, care, and interaction. Many mature wild-caught animals that do survive transit, and are ultimately sold, can be difficult as pets; they have a natural fear of humans, having not been raised by humans themselves, or being bred from parents raised by humans.

See also
 Wildlife trade

Notes

External links
Herpetoculture and Conservation
Resources for herpetoculturists
A French portal about herpetoculture
Honduras Herpetoculturists Portal 
herpetoculture lobbyist organization USARK
A Primer on Reptiles and Amphibians

Amphibians in captivity
Reptiles and humans
Pet keeping